Ma Ma Lay (born 7 February 1962) is a Burmese politician who currently serves as an Amyotha Hluttaw member of parliament for Shan State No.8 Constituency. She is a member of the National League for Democracy.

Early life and education 
Ma Ma Lay was born on 7 February 1962 in Pindaya, Shan State, Myanmar. She is an ethnic Danu. She graduated with BSc Chemistry from Yangon University. Her former work is as a farmer.

Political career
She is a member of the National League for Democracy Party, she was elected as an Amyotha Hluttaw MP, winning a majority of 40334 votes and elected representative from Shan State No. 8 parliamentary constituency.

References

National League for Democracy politicians
1962 births
Living people
People from Shan State